The Wolf is the second studio album by American hard rock musician Andrew W.K., released on Island Records on September 9, 2003.

History
In contrast to W.K.'s party-oriented debut, The Wolf was a more elaborate and ornate effort, with insightful lyrics and a more melodic sound. This did not stop it from being successful. The album also found W.K. playing all of the instruments on the album, whereas on I Get Wet he split the chore with studio musicians. The Wolf spawned the singles "Never Let Down" and "Tear It Up".

This album was originally titled Blow Your Bone, but the title was deemed "too offensive" by Island Records, so Andrew W.K. opted to use the name The Wolf. Cover art was even made with the original title, but it differed from the cover art of The Wolf. It is not known whether the album had different material on it, as the only actual thing referencing the title was an ad made just before the album's release. The release date on the ad for Blow Your Bone did not change from the date that The Wolf was actually released.

The Japan release of The Wolf came with a bonus DVD, with behind the scenes footage (mainly shot in Japan) that cannot be found on any other release.

DualDisc version 

This album was included among a group of 15 DualDisc releases that were test marketed in two cities: Boston and Seattle. The DualDisc has the standard album on one side, and bonus material on the second side.

Track listing

Personnel
Andrew W.K. – vocals, guitar, bass, drums, piano, synthesizer
Ken Andrews – guitar (bonus tracks)
Jimmy Coup – guitar (bonus tracks)
Erik Payne – guitar (bonus tracks)
Frank Werner – guitar (bonus tracks)
Gregg Roberts – bass (bonus tracks)
Donald Tardy – drums (bonus tracks)
 Billy Trudel – backing vocals (tracks 1, 5, 10, 11)
 Roger Lian – editing
 Ryan Boesch – engineering, recording
 Howie Weinberg – mastering
 Dave Way – mixing
 Lior Goldenberg – addition mixing and recording

Charts

References

External links
 

2003 albums
Island Records albums
Andrew W.K. albums
Albums produced by Scott Humphrey